His Honour Herbert James Baxter OBE (6 March 1900 – 3 May 1974), was a British judge, Intelligence Officer and Liberal Party politician.

Background
Baxter was born the son of James Baxter. He was educated at Bishop Wordsworth's School, Salisbury and Exeter College, Oxford. In 1931 he married Mary Kathleen Young. They had one son and two daughters. He was awarded the OBE and the Order of Orange-Nassau in 1946.

Professional career
Baxter was for two years in the Inland Revenue. He was then a private schoolmaster. In 1927 he received a Call to Bar. by the Inner Temple. He was a Major in the Intelligence Corps from 1940–43. He was a Circuit Judge (formerly County Court Judge), from 1955–73.

Political career
Baxter was Liberal candidate for the Dover division of Kent at the 1929 General Election. Dover was a safe Unionist seat that the Liberals had not contested in either the 1923 General Election, the 1924 by-election or the 1924 General Election. Despite this, he managed to poll nearly as many votes as the second placed Labour Party candidate. He was re-selected as prospective Liberal candidate for Dover. Due to the formation of the National Government in September 1931 he did not contest the 1931 General Election, withdrawing on 16 October. He was Liberal candidate for the safe Unionist Hornsey division of Middlesex at the 1935 General Election. The Unionist was again the comfortable victor and Baxter finished third. In February 1939 he was approached by Dover Liberal Association to return to be their prospective candidate at the general election expected to occur later that year. However, the election was postponed due to the outbreak of war. He did not stand for parliament again.

Electoral record

See also
Kathleen Baxter

References

1900 births
1974 deaths
Liberal Party (UK) parliamentary candidates
People educated at Bishop Wordsworth's School
Alumni of Exeter College, Oxford
Members of the Inner Temple
British Army personnel of World War II
Intelligence Corps officers
County Court judges (England and Wales)